Cucumariidae is a family of sea cucumbers, marine animals with elongated bodies, leathery skins and tentacles that are found on the sea bed.

Description
Members of the family Cucumariidae are small to medium-sized sea cucumbers, characterised by ten branching tentacles of which the lowest two are often smaller than the others. They are filter feeders, using their tentacles to catch micro-organisms and pass them to their mouth. They are seldom found on coral reefs but mostly live in deep water on sand and gravel substrates.

Certain genera including the sea apples in the genera Paracucumaria and Pseudocolochirus, contain toxic holothurin and holotoxin and release it into the water when damaged or killed. Spawning may also be accompanied by release of these toxins. For this reason, although they are interesting and attractive to keep in aquaria, it is inadvisable to keep them in a tank with other reef species.

Taxonomy
A number of species that were placed in the family Phyllophoridae by Thander in 1989 and 1990 are now included in Cucumariidae. The following genera are accepted in the family Cucumariidae:

Abyssocucumis Heding, 1942
Actinocucumis Ludwig, 1875
Amphicyclus Bell, 1884
Anaperus Troschel, 1846
Apseudocnus Levin, 2006
Apsolidium O'Loughlin & O' Hara, 1992
Aslia Rowe, 1970
Athyonidium Deichmann, 1941
Australocnus O'Loughlin & Alcock, 2000
Benthophyllophorus Deichmann, 1954
Calcamariina O'Loughlin in O'Loughlin et al., 2015
Cercodemas Selenka, 1867
Cherbocnus Thandar in Thandar & Mjobo, 2014
Cladodactyla Brandt, 1835
Colochirus Troschel, 1846
Cucamba O'Loughlin, 2009
Cucumaria Blainville, 1830
Cucusquama O'Loughlin in O'Loughlin, Tavancheh & Harding, 2016
Cucuvitrum O'Loughlin & O' Hara, 1992
Echinopsolus Gutt, 1990
Ekmania Hansen & McKenzie, 1991
Euthyonacta Deichmann, 1954
Hemiocnus Mjobo & Thandar, 2016
Hemioedema Hérouard, 1929
Heterocucumis Panning, 1949
Incubocnus Thandar & Vinola, 2017
Lanceophora Thandar, Zettler & Arumugam, 2010
Leptopentacta H.L. Clark, 1938
Loisettea Rowe & Pawson, 1985
Mensamaria H.L. Clark, 1946
Neoamphicyclus Hickman, 1962
Neocucumella Pawson, 1962
Neocucumis Deichmann, 1944
Ocnus Forbes & Goodsir, in Forbes, 1841
Orbithyone Clark, 1938
Panningia Cherbonnier, 1958
Paracolochirus Pawson, Pawson & King, 2010
Paracucumaria Panning, 1949
Paraleptopentacta Mezali, Thandar & Khodja, 2020
Parathyonacta Caso, 1984
Parathyone Deichmann, 1957
Parathyonidium Heding in Heding & Panning, 1954
Patallus Selenka, 1868
Pawsonellus Thandar, 1986
Pawsonia Rowe, 1970
Pentacta Goldfuss, 1820
Pentactella Verrill, 1876
Pentocnus O'Loughlin & O'Hara, 1992
Plesiocolochirus Cherbonnier, 1946
Pseudoaslia Thandar, 1991
Pseudocnella Thandar, 1987
Pseudocnus Panning, 1949
Pseudocolochirus Pearson, 1910
Pseudopsolus Ludwig, 1898
Pseudrotasfer Bohn, 2007
Psolicrux O'Loughlin, 2002
Psolicucumis Heding, 1934
Psolidiella Mortensen, 1926
Psolidocnus O'Loughlin & Alcock, 2000
Roweia Thandar, 1985
Squamocnus O'Loughlin & O'Hara, 1992
Staurocucumis Ekman, 1927
Staurothyone H.L. Clark, 1938
Stereoderma Ayres, 1851
Thyonella Verrill, 1872
Thyonidium Düben & Koren, 1846
Trachasina  Thandar
Trachycucumis Thandar & Moodley, 2003
Trachythyone Studer, 1876

References

 
Echinoderm families